The Nortel Norstar, previously the Meridian Norstar,  was a small and medium-sized business digital key telephone system introduced by Nortel (formerly Northern Telecom) and later sold to Avaya. It featured automatic call distribution, and supported up to 192 extensions.  In the United Kingdom it was sold by British Telecom, rebadged as the BT Norstar.

History

With the advent of LSI ICs, also called integrated circuits in the 1980s, key telephone system design went from electro-mechanical parts to electronic or fully digital parts.  The first key system developed by Northern Telecom in the early 1980s was the Vantage TDD system. Unlike the success of the SL1 system, the Vantage system did not catch with the business environment and the Meridian Norstar was developed as its replacement.

In 1988, Nortel developed the Meridian Norstar system.  This system directly competed with the AT&T Merlin, ROLM Redwood, Executone/Isotec Hybrid systems, Toshiba DK Strata, and NEC hybrid systems.  Unlike the earlier Vantage system, the Norstar went on to be one of the leading telephone systems in the world.  It is visible worldwide with installations at major retail chains, educational environments, medical institutions, government facilities, and many places where key telephone systems are required.

The Norstar system went further than the other systems in similarity to a PBX system such as the Meridian SL-1/Meridian 1 system developed in the late 1980s as well.  This allowed blurring the distinction of key telephone system versus PBX telephone system.  Many features such as Direct Inward Dial, Caller ID, Automatic Call Distribution, and Call Accounting were designed off the larger Meridian 1 PBX, DMS-100 and Meridian SL-100 as opposed to being developed as an independent system.

Although there were many hardware/design similarities between the Norstar systems and larger Meridian 1/Meridian SL-100 systems, the telephones themselves could not be used interchangeably between the key system and PBX. They were, however, backward compatible on their respective switch.  That is, the oldest Meridian M7000 telephones can be used on the newest Business Communication Manager system.  The latest T7000 series telephones can also be used on an older Norstar system such as the DR5.1.  This allows companies to invest in hardware as needed.

Telephone design
When introduced in 1988, Norstar telephones were developed with highly advanced features.  The telephones were rugged in design, available in grey, ash and black colors, and featured LCD displays, color-coded keys with easy to read fonts, a high quality speaker phone, and a quick reference card located underneath the handset. The handsets were known for their heavy-duty design and high clarity audio.

The Feature key present on each telephone model allowed for access to both advanced features (including paging, transfer, conferencing, and voicemail) and local settings (such as language, display contrast, ring tones, and speed dial).

Migration to BCM (Business Communication Manager)

The Norstar system is no longer produced by Nortel and branded as the "Nortel Norstar" system.  The recommended migration path from the Norstar to a full VOIP/SIP system is the BCM, which is short for Business Communication Manager.  There are two systems available, the BCM50 for smaller enterprises with 3-30 extensions and the BCM450 which allows up to 300 sets.  After Avaya's acquisition of Nortel's Enterprise Division,  it announced that the Norstar and BCM systems would continue being manufactured, but under the Avaya name.  According to Avaya, the Norstar/BCM systems and telephone sets would eventually integrate with the Avaya IP Office via Avaya Aura.  Nortel features and programming would be preserved, but would accompany Avaya features and programming as well.

For clients that want to move from the Norstar digital system format to a VOIP format, Nortel BCM is the replacement product recommended by Nortel/Avaya.   BCM uses all of the feature codes, and calling features of the older Norstar systems and integrates them into a Digital/VOIP format that with RLS3.0 and further, allows SIP trunking, Unified Messaging and the use of Nortel M7000 digital telephones, "T" Series Business Sets, i2004 sets, series 1200 VOIP sets, and the high end 1100E VOIP series sets, such as the Bluetooth compatible Nortel IP Phone 1140E SIP telephone series VOIP telephones.  The advantage is that customers can use a mix of different generations of Nortel Telephones, ranging from early M7000 telephones to the latest full color display Nortel 1165E telephones. Unlike the past where M7000 Meridian telephones were dedicated for the smaller Norstar system and M2000/M3900 Meridian telephones were dedicated to the larger Option 11E/61C/81C PBX, the i2000/1200/1100E series IP telephones function on both the small-medium business (SMB) BCM platform as well as the larger Enterprise Communication Server 1000/Avaya Communication Server 2100 platforms, both taking on the features and codes on the display from their respective switch.

See also 
 Business telephone system
 Portico TVA
 Telephone hook

References 

Avaya
Nortel products
Telephone exchanges